Lindsay Breen (born 16 July 1971) is a New Zealand former cricketer. He played eight first-class matches for Otago between 1993 and 1995.

Breen was born at Alexandra in Central Otago and educated at Southland Boys' High School in Invercargill. Professionally he is a human resources consultant.

References

External links
 

1971 births
Living people
New Zealand cricketers
Otago cricketers
People from Alexandra, New Zealand